The monte yellow finch (Sicalis mendozae) is a species of bird in the family Thraupidae.  It is found in western Argentina. Its natural habitats are subtropical or tropical high-altitude shrubland and heavily degraded former forest.

References

 

Sicalis
Birds of Argentina
Endemic birds of Argentina
Birds described in 1888